This is a list of historic and existing passenger train stations in Arizona, United States.

A 
 Aguila, Arizona. Originally Arizona and California Railway depot. Built 1905. Last Atchison, Topeka and Santa Fe Railway service 1955. Moved to Scottsdale's McCormick-Stillman Railroad Park in 1972. Still stands.
 Ajo, Arizona. Built 1916. Last Tucson, Cornelia and Gila Bend Railroad mixed passenger service in 1984. Still stands.
 Ash Fork. Escalante Harvey House and depot built 1907. Last ATSF passenger service 1969. Razed 1984. Freight station still stands as BNSF maintenance of way crewhouse.

B
 Benson, Arizona. Built 1880. Last Southern Pacific passenger service 1971. Razed 1970s. Replica of Benson depot built on this location in early 2000s for Chamber of Commerce. Amtrak's Sunset Limited and Texas Eagle stop at a shed nearby.
 Benson. San Pedro and Southwestern Railroad Depot. Portable-module structure located one mile south of downtown. Current offices of SPSR Railroad, a 7-mile long freight hauler. Passenger facilities were located at depot from 1995 to 2000, when previous SWKR-owned railroad offered 'Grey Hawk' passenger excursions from Benson-Charleston along the San Pedro River. Depot office Still stands.
 Bowie.
 Buckeye.

C
 Casa Grande, Arizona. Built 1879. New depot built 1924. Last Southern Pacific passenger service 1960s. Destroyed in a fire in 2009.
 Chandler, Arizona. Built 1911. Last SP passenger service 1964. Razed 1970s. The Arizona Railway Museum built a similar building nearby as its headquarters.
 Clarkdale, Arizona. Built 1912 by Verde Valley Railway. Last ATSF mixed passenger service 1955. Depot burned 1970s. Verde Canyon Railroad tourist train service returned in November 1990, new depot built in 1996 by Durbano Family.
 Clifton, Arizona. Built 1913 by Arizona and New Mexico Railway. Last SP mixed passenger service 1967. Still stands. Replica of this depot built in late 1990s at Scottsdale's Stillman-McCormick Railroad Park
 Cochise, Arizona. Built in 1905. Moved to 1825 W Dragoon Rd. within the town limits of Cochise and is now the Cochise Marijuana Dispensary. 
 Coolidge, Arizona. Built 1925. Retired 1973, razed 1970s. Last Amtrak passenger service at nearby shed, 1996.

D
 Dome.
 Douglas, Arizona. Built 1913 by El Paso and Southwestern Railroad. Last SP passenger service 1963. San Pedro and Southwestern Railroad (SPSR) briefly used the depot from 1992 to 1995 for a crew terminal, prior to abandonment of their Paul Spur-Douglas trackage. Still stands as City of Douglas Police Department.
 Dragoon.
 Drake, Arizona. (Changed name from Cedar Glade, 1920) Built 1901. Last passenger services 1955 and 1969. Depot moved to Prescott in 1970s and is now a gift shop adjacent to Hillside Station on Iron Springs Road.

E
 Eloy.
 Estrella.

F
 Flagstaff. Built 1889 by Atlantic and Pacific Railroad. Restored 1999 as a new BNSF office. ATSF depot built 1926, last ATSF passenger service 1971. Currently served by Amtrak's Southwest Chief. Both still stand.
 Florence.  Southern Pacific.
 Fortuna. Southern Pacific.
 Fort Thomas.  Southern Pacific.

G
 Gila Bend, Arizona. Built 1915 by SP. Last SP passenger service 1960s. Last TC&GB mixed passenger service 1984. Depot razed 1970s.
 Gilbert.  Southern Pacific.
 Glendale, Arizona. Original Santa Fe, Prescott and Phoenix Railway depot build 1895, retired 1961. New depot built 1959. Last ATSF passenger service 1969. Depot still stands.
 Globe, Arizona.  Built 1916 by Arizona Eastern Railroad. Last SP passenger service 1953. Still stands. Was served by Arizona Eastern Railway's 'Copper Spike' excursion motorcar in 2006.
 Grand Canyon. Depot built 1904 by Santa Fe and Grand Canyon Railroad. Last ATSF passenger service July 1968. Restored by National Park Service, 1987. Excursion service began September 1989 by Grand Canyon Railway.
 Grand Canyon. El Tovar Harvey House. Built in 1905 by Santa Fe Railway architect Charles Whittlesey. Still stands. Currently owned by National Park Service and operated by Xanterra.
 Grand Canyon. Bright Angel Lodge. Built for ATSF Railway in 1935 by renowned architect Elizabeth Jane Colter (Mary E. J. Colter). Still stands. Currently owned by National Park Service and operated by Xanterra.

H
 Hayden.  Southern Pacific.
 Hillside. Built 1902 by SFP&P. Last passenger service 1969. Depot moved to Prescott 1970s, now a restaurant adjacent to Drake Station gift shop in Iron Springs Road.
 Holbrook. Built 1892 by A&P. Enlarged 1907, 1912. Last ATSF passenger service 1971. Still stands. Restored in 2006.
 Hyder (formerly Agua). Built 1926 by SP. Last passenger service 1944. Razed in 1950s. Site of still-unsolved 1995 derailment of Amtrak's Sunset Limited.

J
 Jerome, Arizona. Built c. 1919 for the Verde Tunnel & Smelter Railroad from Clarkdale, Arizona, to Jerome.  Passenger service consisted of intermittent traffic via rail bus.  Entire railroad abandoned in 1953.  Depot still stands on Phelps Dodge property in a fenced-in area at the Jerome Open Pit. Current Photo #1#2

K
 Kingman, Arizona. Built 1907. Last ATSF passenger service 1971. Currently served by Amtrak's Southwest Chief. Restored in 2007.
 Kingman - Harvey House. Built 1901.  Renovated for use by soldiers training at Kingman Airfield in 1942.  A fire destroyed all interiors in 1952, and it was razed a year later.

L
 Litchfield, Arizona. Built 1926 by Southern Pacific to serve the communities of Goodyear, Avondale and Litchfield Park. Last SP passenger service unknown. Still stands, vacant on property near tracks in Avondale.

M
 Maricopa, Arizona. Built 1879. The earliest was a two-storey wooden building with deep eaves and prominent brick chimneys. Later razed, it was replaced in the 1930s by a small clapboard depot that was moved to Scottsdale's McCormick-Stillman Railroad Park in 2004. Amtrak has stopped at a new portable structure nearby since late 1990s.
 Mesa, Arizona. Built 1931. Last SP passenger service 1971. The 1980 "Hattie B" flood relief train served this station. Burned, January 1989.
 Mescal.  Southern Pacific.
 Miami, Arizona. Built 1920s by Arizona Eastern Railway. Last SP mixed passenger service, 1953. Still stands.

N
 Nogales, Arizona. Built 1914 by SP. Last SP mixed passenger service, 1951. Razed, 1963 for an enlarged border crossing.

P
 Parker, Arizona. Built 1907 by Arizona & California RR. Last ATSF passenger service 1955. Still in use by ARZC as a company office.
 Patagonia, Arizona. Built 1900 by New Mexico & Arizona. Last SP passenger service 1962. Still stands. Restored in 1990s and 2000s
 Peoria, Arizona. Built 1895 by SFP&P. Last ATSF passenger service 1969. Moved to Scottsdale McCormick park, 1972. Still Stands.
 Perkinsville, Arizona. Built 1912 by Verde Valley Railroad. Last ATSF mixed passenger service, 1955. Verde Canyon passenger service returned adjacent to depot in November 1990. Privately owned by Perkins Family Ranch. Still Stands.
 Phoenix Union Station. Built 1923 by SP and ATSF. Last ATSF passenger service, April 1969. Last SPRR service May 1971. Last Amtrak service, June 1996. Still stands. Restored in 1990s and 2000s, owned by telecommunications company.
 Phoenix SFP&P depot. Built 1895. Retired 1923.
 Phoenix SFP&P 2nd depot. Built early teens. Retired 1950s.
 Phoenix M&P / Arizona Eastern depot. Built 18??. Retired 1950s.
 Prescott, Arizona. Built 1907 by SFP&P. Last ATSF passenger service April 1962. Still stands.
 Picacho.  Southern Pacific.
 Pima.  Southern Pacific.

R
 Ray Junction.  Southern Pacific.
 Red Rock, Arizona. Built 1917 to 2-Story Combination Depot No. 22 plan by Southern Pacific. Last SP passenger service unknown. Still stands as residence near tracks in community of Red Rock, northwest Tucson.
 Rillito, Arizona. Built 19?? by Southern Pacific. Last SP passenger service unknown. Still stands vacant adjacent to tracks in northwest Tucson.

S
 Safford, Arizona. Built 1928 by Arizona Eastern/SP. Last SP passenger service 1953. Still stands.
 Salome, Arizona. Built 1905 by Arizona & California RR. Last ATSF passenger service 1955. It is no longer there as of October 2021.
 San Simon. Southern Pacific.
 Seligman, Arizona. El Havasu Harvey House. Built 1897 by A&P. Last ATSF passenger service 1971. Last Amtrak service 1984. Demolished, 2008.
 Sentinel.  Southern Pacific.
 Steins. Southern Pacific.
 Stockham.  Southern Pacific.
 Skull Valley, Arizona. Built 1895 by Prescott & Eastern RR. Moved from Cherry Creek, 1926. Last passenger service, April 1969. Currently used as town museum.
 Superior, Arizona. Built 1923 by Magma Copper. Last mixed passenger service 1940. Razed by BHP-Billiton and Resolution Copper Company in early 2000s.

T
 Tempe. Built 1924 by SP. Last Amtrak service, June 1996.  Still stands; used as Macayo's Depot Cantina restaurant. METRO light rail station located 1 block east of depot.
 Tombstone. Built 1882 by EP&SW. Last SP passenger service, August 1960. Still stands.
 Tucson. Built 1907. Remodeled 1942. Current Amtrak service. Restored in early 2000s, now features restaurants, shops and Southern Arizona Transportation Museum.
 Tucson - El Paso & Southwestern depot. Built 1913. Last passenger service 1960s. Still stands; was used as a restaurant. Vacant in 2007.

W
 Wellton.  Southern Pacific.
 Wickenburg, Arizona. Depot built 1895 by SFP&P. Last ATSF passenger service April 1969. Still stands; used as Wickenburg Chamber of Commerce.
 Willcox, Arizona. Built 1914 by SP. Last SP passenger service 1971. Restored by city, 1999.
 Williams. Atlantic and Pacific Railroad depot built 1885. Last passenger service 1908. Still stands; used as Williams Chamber of Commerce since 1994.
 Williams. Atchison, Topeka and Santa Fe Railway depot built 1908. Last ATSF passenger service December 1960. Still stands; used by Grand Canyon Railway as their terminal since 1989. Owned and operated by Xanterra since 2007.
 Williams. Fray Marcos Harvey House. AT&SF built 1908. Last hotel patrons in 1954. Purchased and restored in 1989 by Biegert Family. Still stands; used by Grand Canyon Railway as their gift shop, offices, dispatching, commissary and storage since 1989. Modern Grand Canyon Railway Hotel opened in 1995 to the north of 1908 structure. Owned and operated by Xanterra since 2007.
 Williams Junction. Built 1960 by ATSF. Last ATSF passenger service April 1969. Razed 1984. Platform rebuilt 1999 for restored Amtrak Southwest Chief service and connecting bus shuttle to Williams Grand Canyon Railway depot.
 Winslow, Arizona. Depot built 1930 by ATSF. Last ATSF passenger service 1971. Currently served by Amtrak.
 Winslow. La Posada Harvey House. Built for ATSF Railway in 1929 by renowned architect Elizabeth Jane Colter (Mary E. J. Colter). Last hotel patrons in 1957. Still stands. Housed ATSF dispatching offices until Spring 1995. Purchased and restored in 1997 by Affeldt / Mion Family. Now an operating hotel named 'La Posada Hotel & Gardens'. Features dining, shops, art galleries, gardens, museum and trading post and is accessed by Amtrak service and Route 66.

Y
 Yuma. Built 1926 by SP. Housed the Yuma Fine Arts Museum after 1971. Burned 1995. Current Amtrak services at nearby platform.

Depot gallery

The following are images of some of the remaining railroad stations including some of them who are in ruins.

Notes

Sources
 Field observations and inspections – 1987–2007, W. Lindley (Arizona Rail Passenger Association) and M. Pearsall (Arizona DOT). Historic Official Railway Guides and timetables.
 Arizona Rail Passenger Association – http://www.azrail.org/

Atchison, Topeka and Santa Fe Railway
Southern Pacific Railroad
Railway stations
Lists of railway stations in the United States
Train stations